Halina Mierzejewska (1922 – November 14, 2003) was a professor of linguistics at the University of Warsaw, in the Institute of Polish Language.

Mierzejewska served as the honorary president of the Polish College of Logopedes. Her research focused on neurolinguistics, logopedics, and dyslexia.

Works

See also
List of Poles

References

Linguists from Poland
Women linguists
1922 births
2003 deaths
Polish women academics
20th-century linguists
Academic staff of the University of Warsaw